Between 23 and 29 September 2006, youths of mainly immigrant descent rioted in Brussels, causing the destruction of several shop windows and the burning of ten cars and part of a hospital.  The immediate cause of the riots was anger at the unexplained death in custody of a local man of Moroccan origin, Fayçal Chaaban.

A court later found 2 prison doctors guilty of assault/battery and failing to aid a person in mortal danger having administered a fatal dose of tranquilizers and gave them a 6-month suspended jail sentence.

Death of Fayçal Chaaban
Fayçal Chaaban, 25, had been involved in criminal activities since he was 13. He had been convicted for stealing in 2001, 2003, 2004 and 2005, and had been in prison since 16 September on the suspicion of theft.  He started to serve a 10-month term in the prison of Forest, a Brussels municipality, after being caught at the wheel of a vehicle with no driving license and no insurance.

Chaaban was found dead in his cell on 24 September.  He died after being administered tranquilizers in his cell.  An autopsy on the body failed to throw a light on the exact cause of death.  According to police pathologists, the body didn't show any traces of violence. Further tests were needed to determine whether there is a link between the tranquilizers and the death, but prosecutors said the results of toxicology tests would take weeks to come back from the laboratory.

Belgian Justice Minister Laurette Onkelinx visited the deceased man's family shortly after his death.

Riots 
The riots began in the Marolles (Marollen) quarter of Brussels and the area near the Brussels-South Railway Station on the evening of 23 September 2006. Between 1 and 4 am, ten cars were set on fire, several car and shop windows were smashed, and one shop was set alight. Violence continued each night during the next days. On 26 September, after hearing the news on the death of Fayçal Chaaban, crowds of young persons started throwing stones at passing people and cars, smashing car windows and setting them ablaze, demolishing bus shelters and looting shops. The rioters also threw molotov cocktails into CHU Saint-Pierre, which caught fire and required fire brigade intervention. During the incident, the rioters managed to steal the keys of the fire engine.

Brussels' police arrested 30 rioters on 26 September 45 rioters on 27 September and 53 rioters on 28 September. Police said some of those arrested were carrying material to make petrol bombs. At least 242 crime files were opened by the police.

Most rioters were identified as immigrant youths from North-African origin, who claimed that they are upset by the death of Chaaban. A Belgian official said that the rioting was the worst since youths set fire to 15 vehicles across Belgium in November 2005, in violent riots which authorities said imitated unrest then going on in France.

On Belgian RTBF radio, Brussels's mayor Freddy Thielemans thanked the family of the late Fayçal Chaaban for helping to try to calm down the rioters.

By 29 September, the situation was said to be calm again.

See also

2013 Trappes riots
2013 Stockholm riots
2011 English riots
2010 Rinkeby riots
2009 French riots
2007 Villiers-le-Bel riots
2005 French riots

Sectarian violence

References

Brussels riots
Protests in Belgium
Protests in the European Union
Race riots
Brussels Riots, 2006
Racism in Belgium
Riots and civil disorder in Belgium
2000s in Brussels
September 2006 events in Europe